PLCAA may refer to:

 Professional Lawn Care Association of America, a defunct company that merged into Professional Landcare Network
 Protection of Lawful Commerce in Arms Act, a law that restricts lawsuits against the firearms industry